The 2022 Tour of Belgium (known as the 2022 Baloise Belgium Tour for sponsorship purposes) was the 91st edition of the Tour of Belgium road cycling stage race, which took place from 15 to 19 June 2022. The category 2.Pro event formed a part of the 2022 UCI ProSeries.

Teams 
Eight of the nineteen UCI WorldTeams, six UCI ProTeams, and eight UCI Continental teams made up the twenty-two teams that participated in the race.

UCI WorldTeams

 
 
 
 
 
 
 
 

UCI ProTeams

 
 
 
 
 
 

UCI Continental Teams

Route

Stages

Stage 1 
15 June 2022 — Merelbeke to Maarkedal,

Stage 2 
16 June 2022 — Beveren to Knokke-Heist,

Stage 3 
17 June 2022 —  Scherpenheuvel-Zichem to Scherpenheuvel-Zichem,

Stage 4 
18 June 2022 — Durbuy to Durbuy,

Stage 5 
19 June 2022 — Gingelom to Beringen,

Classification leadership table 

 On stage 2, Tim Wellens, who was second in the points classification, wore the red jersey, because first placed Mads Pedersen wore the blue jersey as the leader of the general classification.
 On stages 3 and 4, Jasper Philipsen, who was second in the points classification, wore the red jersey, because first placed Mads Pedersen wore the blue jersey as the leader of the general classification.

Classification standings

General classification

Points classification

Combativity classification

Young rider classification

Team classification

References

External links 
 

2022
2022 in Belgian sport
2022 UCI Europe Tour
2022 UCI ProSeries
June 2022 sports events in Belgium